Diptychus sewerzowi is a species of cyprinid freshwater fish found in highlands of Central Asia.

References 
 

Diptychus
Fish described in 1872